Dale Ahlquist (born June 14, 1958) is an American author and advocate of the thought of G. K. Chesterton. Ahlquist is the president and co-founder of the American Chesterton Society and the publisher of its magazine, Gilbert. He is also the co-founder of Chesterton Academy, a Catholic high school in Minneapolis.

Background and education
The fifth of six children, Ahlquist grew up in Mendota Heights, Minnesota, across the Mississippi River from downtown St. Paul. He graduated from Henry Sibley High School, where his father, Albert Ahlquist, was a biology teacher.

Ahlquist received a B.A. from Carleton College in Northfield, Minnesota, and M.A. from Hamline University in St. Paul, Minnesota.

His sister, former actress and model Pamela Fay Ahlquist, was married to Christian rock pioneer Larry Norman from 1971 to 1980. His brother, David Ahlquist, is a physician at the Mayo Clinic in Rochester, Minnesota.

Conversion to Catholicism
Raised in a Baptist household, Dale Ahlquist observed the developing fragmentation of Protestant denominations. Reading G. K. Chesterton’s The Everlasting Man during his honeymoon in Rome profoundly changed his life and inevitably led to research into the Early Church Fathers and the history of the Catholic Church. Systematically, Dale began to see his point-by-point objections to Catholicism wither away on matters of the papacy, the sacraments of the Catholic Church, and the Blessed Virgin Mary. In 1996 he founded the American Chesterton Society. He was received into the Catholic Church on the Feast of the Holy Family in 1997, along with his two oldest children Julian and Ashley. His wife, Laura, who had not been a practicing Catholic when they met, also returned to the Church.

American Chesterton Society
The American Chesterton Society (ACS) is a 501(c)3 non-profit organization co-founded by Dale Ahlquist in 1996 with the mission of promoting interest in English author, G. K. Chesterton. The ACS is the leading resource for scholarly research on Chesterton, hosts annual conferences across the United States and abroad, international pilgrimages, and offers guidance to more than 60 local societies dedicated to Chesterton around the world including Canada, Mexico, Argentina, Brazil, France, Italy, Spain, and Russia.

In 2000, Ahlquist quit his job as a political lobbyist to run the American Chesterton Society full-time.

Gilbert: The Magazine of the American Chesterton Society
Gilbert! is the flagship magazine of the American Chesterton Society and is published and edited by Dale Ahlquist (formerly edited by Sean P. Dailey.) It is published six times a year. Each issue contains original writings by and about Chesterton, but also covers a wide variety of subjects including family life, the arts, politics, faith, current events, popular culture, literary and film criticism, and original short fiction.

The Apostle of Common Sense television series
The television program, G. K. Chesterton: The Apostle of Common Sense, appears on EWTN. For seven seasons Dale Ahlquist hosted The Apostle of Common Sense featuring Chuck Chalberg as G. K. Chesterton and Kevin O’Brien as Stanford Nutting, Father Brown, and Nietzsche, amongst other characters, with guest appearances by Julian and Ashley Ahlquist, Kaiser Johnson, and Frank C. Turner. The series is designed to help viewers discover G. K. Chesterton. Ahlquist has covered Chesterton’s most popular books and beloved characters on the show, including the famous sleuth Father Brown, Innocent Smith, and Chesterton’s friends and foes George Bernard Shaw, H. G. Wells, and Clarence Darrow.

Chesterton Academy
Dale Ahlquist is the co-founder of Chesterton Academy, a high school in Minneapolis, Minnesota, that is centered on G. K. Chesterton’s ideas of integrated learning. Launched in the fall of 2008 with just 10 students, the school now enrolls more than 100 students in grades nine through twelve and offers summer school programs, options for homeschool students, and adult enrichment classes.

Oxford University 

In 2012, he was named a Senior Fellow of the Chesterton Library at Oxford University.

National Board for Education Sciences 
Ahlquist was nominated on December 3, 2020 to be a member of the Board of Directors of National Board for Education Sciences by President Donald Trump.

Books
The Gift of Wonder: The Many Sides of G.K. Chesterton (Editor), American Chesterton Society, 2001. 
The Apostle of Common Sense, Ignatius Press, 2003. 
G.K. Chesterton's Sherlock Holmes (Contributor), The Lilly Library, 2003, 
Lepanto (Editor), Ignatius Press, 2004. 
A Miscellany of Men (Introduction), IHS Press, 2004, 
Common Sense 101: Lessons from G.K. Chesterton, Ignatius Press, 2006. 
The Well and the Shallows (Introduction), Ignatius Press, 2006. 
The Catholic Church and Conversion (Introduction), Ignatius Press, 2006. 
G. K. Chesterton on G. F. Watts (Contributor), Watts Gallery, 2008, 
In Defense of Sanity (Editor), Ignatius Press, 2011. 
Manalive (Editor), Ignatius Press, 2011. 
The Universe According to G. K. Chesterton: A Dictionary of the Mad, Mundane and Metaphysical (Editor), Dover Publications, 2011. 
The Complete Thinker, Ignatius Press, 2012. 
The Defendant (Editor), Dover Publications, 2012. 
The Soul of Wit: G.K. Chesterton on William Shakespeare (Editor), Dover Publications, 2012. 
The Hound of Distributism (Contributor), ACS Books, 2012. 
Knight of the Holy Ghost: A Short History of G.K. Chesterton, Ignatius Press & The Augustine Institute, 2018.

References

1958 births
Living people
Writers from Saint Paul, Minnesota
American male writers
Catholics from Minnesota
Converts to Roman Catholicism from Baptist denominations
Carleton College alumni
Hamline University alumni
Writers from Minnesota
People from Mendota Heights, Minnesota
Distributism